Devecser is a district in western part of Veszprém County. Devecser is also the name of the town where the district seat is found. The district is located in the Central Transdanubia Statistical Region.

Geography 
Devecser District borders with Pápa District to the north, Ajka District to the east, Sümeg District to the south, Celldömölk District (Vas County) to the west. The number of the inhabited places in Devecser District is 28.

Municipalities 
The district has 1 town and 27 villages.
(ordered by population, as of 1 January 2013)

The bolded municipality is city.

See also
List of cities and towns in Hungary

References

External links
 Postal codes of the Devecser District

Districts in Veszprém County